The following is the list of awards and nominations received by American actress Cameron Diaz. Diaz's work in film has been recognized by the Hollywood Foreign Press Association and the Screen Actors Guild. She's received four Golden Globe Award nominations; one for Best Actress in a Motion Picture Comedy or Musical (1999) for her performance in There's Something About Mary, and three for Best Supporting Actress in a Motion Picture (for Being John Malkovich, Vanilla Sky and Gangs of New York). She's also received nominations for three Screen Actors Guild Awards; two for Outstanding Performance by a Female Actor in a Supporting Role (for Being John Malkovich and Vanilla Sky) and one for Outstanding Performance by a Cast in a Motion Picture for Being John Malkovich. In 2009, she received a star on the Hollywood Walk of Fame for her work in film.

Major associations

British Academy Film Awards 
0 wins of 1 nomination

Golden Globe Awards 
0 wins of 4 nominations

Screen Actors Guild Awards 
0 wins of 3 nominations

Audience awards

Golden Schmoes Awards 
0 wins of 1 nomination

MTV Movie + TV Awards 
3 wins of 16 nominations

Nickelodeon Kid's Choice Awards 
2 wins of 10 nominations

People's Choice Awards 
1 win of 5 nominations

Teen Choice Awards 
2 wins of 16 nominations

Critical accolades

Alliance of Women Film Journalists Awards 
2 wins of 2 nomination

Award Circuit Community Awards 
0 wins of 4 nominations

Boston Society of Film Critics Awards 
1 win of 1 nomination

Chicago Film Critics Association Awards 
1 win of 1 nomination

Critics' Choice Movie Awards 
0 wins of 1 nomination

Dallas-Fort Worth Film Critics Association Awards 
0 wins of 1 nomination

Imagen Foundation Awards 
1 win of 2 nominations

Las Vegas Film Critics Society Awards 
0 wins of 1 nomination

New York Film Critics Circle Awards 
1 win of 1 nomination

Online Film & Television Association Awards 
1 win of 2 nominations

Online Film Critics Society Awards 
0 wins of 1 nomination

Phoenix Film Critics Society Awards 
0 wins of 1 nomination

ShoWest Convention Awards 
1 win of 1 nomination

International accolades

ALMA Awards 
2 wins of 8 nominations

American Comedy Awards 
1 win of 2 nominations

American Film Institute Awards 
0 wins of 1 nomination

Irish Film and Television Awards 
0 wins of 1 nomination

Italian Online Movie Awards 
0 wins of 1 nomination

Jupiter Awards 
1 win of 1 nomination

MTV Movie Awards, Mexico 
0 wins of 1 nomination

NRJ Cine Awards 
0 wins of 1 nomination

Miscellaneous accolades

20/20 Awards 
0 wins of 1 nomination

Annie Awards 
0 wins of 1 nomination

Blockbuster Entertainment Awards 
4 wins of 4 nominations

Chlotrudis Awards 
0 wins of 1 nomination

CinemaCon Awards 
1 win of 1 nomination

Elle Women in Hollywood Awards 
1 win of 1 nomination

Satellite Awards 
0 wins of 3 nominations

Saturn Awards 
0 wins of 2 nominations

The Stinkers Bad Movie Awards 
1 win of 1 nomination

Walk of Fame 
1 win of 1 nomination

Notes

References 

Awards
Diaz, Cameron